The Story So Far – The Best Of is a compilation album by the English rock band Def Leppard. The album has a similar track listing to previous compilations, however it is the first to include tracks from the band's recent studio efforts Songs from the Sparkle Lounge (2008) and Def Leppard (2015) as well as all three studio tracks from Mirror Ball – Live & More (2011).

Content
The album includes all tracks from their first greatest hits album Vault: Def Leppard Greatest Hits (1980–1995) (1995) with the exception of "Miss You in a Heartbeat".

Unlike the three previous greatest hits releases Vault, Best of Def Leppard (2004) and Rock of Ages: The Definitive Collection (2005), The Story So Far – The Best Of features the Hysteria album versions of the songs "Pour Some Sugar on Me" and "Rocket".

Track listing

Notes
The album was released under two CD configurations, a standard edition which solely consists of disc one and a deluxe edition which consists of both discs. 
The initial pressings of the vinyl version of the album (the songs from disc one), that were bought online, also included "Personal Jesus" (Remix) b/w "We All Need Christmas" as a bonus vinyl single.
"We All Need Christmas" was also released as a stand-alone single for digital purchasing and streaming platforms on 12 October 2018.
On Record Store Day 13 April 2019, the band released volume two of the album (disc two of the CD version).

Charts

Weekly charts

Year-end charts

Certifications

References

External links

2018 greatest hits albums
Def Leppard compilation albums